Platon Viktorovich Krivoshchyokov (born 3 September 1968) is a former Russian professional footballer.

Club career
He made his professional debut in the Soviet First League in 1990 for FC Kuzbass Kemerovo. In 1999, he played abroad in the USL A-League with Toronto Lynx. In his debut season in the Canadian top tier, he appeared in 3 matches. The following season he played in the Southern Ontario circuit the Canadian Professional Soccer League with North York Astros.

Honours
 Russian Premier League bronze: 1992.

References

1968 births
Sportspeople from Novosibirsk
Living people
Soviet footballers
Russian footballers
Association football midfielders
FC Dynamo Moscow players
Russian Premier League players
FC Ural Yekaterinburg players
Toronto Lynx players
North York Astros players
Russian expatriate footballers
Expatriate soccer players in Canada
FC Sibir Novosibirsk players
Canadian Soccer League (1998–present) players
A-League (1995–2004) players
FC Lokomotiv Saint Petersburg players